Jacobs Creek is a stream in northeast St. Francois County in the U.S. state of Missouri. It is a tributary of Hazel Run.

The stream headwaters arise along the south side of a mountain bearing the French Village fire lookout tower at an elevation of about 940 feet. The community of French Village is about two miles to the east on Missouri Route Y. The stream flows to the southwest for about three miles to its confluence with Hazel Run just northwest of the community of Hazel Run at an elevation of 738 feet.

Jacobs Creek has the name of Jacob Mostiller, the original owner of the site.

See also
List of rivers of Missouri

References

Rivers of St. Francois County, Missouri
Rivers of Missouri